Scott Alexander (born June 16, 1963) and Larry Karaszewski (born November 20, 1961) are an American screenwriting team. They are best known for writing postmodern biopics with larger-than-life characters. They coined the term "anti-biopic" to describe the genre they invented: Movies about people who don't deserve one. They are uninterested in the traditional "great man" story, focusing instead on obscure strivers in American pop culture.

They met at the University of Southern California where they were freshman roommates; they graduated from the School of Cinematic Arts in 1985.

Biography
Their first success was the popular but critically derided comedy Problem Child (1990). Alexander and Karaszewski claim that their original screenplay was a sophisticated black comedy, but that the studio replaced them and watered it down into an unrecognizable state. With the studio in a hurry to make a sequel, they returned to write Problem Child 2.

In 1992, dissatisfied with their career, they decided to write a biopic about Edward D. Wood, Jr. Rather than mocking him, they identified with the obscure filmmaker and his struggles. Tim Burton loved their script Ed Wood and agreed to direct it. They had written the screenplay in six weeks.

Ed Wood’s acclaim led to a succession of offbeat biopics. They wrote The People vs. Larry Flynt and Man on the Moon (about the short life of comedian Andy Kaufman), both films directed by Milos Forman. They produced Auto Focus, chronicling the downfall and subsequent murder of Hogan's Heroes star Bob Crane. A script they penned about the life of Robert Ripley of Ripley's Believe It or Not! was at one time attached to Jim Carrey, but like their script about The Marx Brothers, it has yet to be produced.

They also adapted Stephen King's short story 1408, did uncredited rewrites on Mars Attacks!, and worked on a number of family films, such as Agent Cody Banks, a remake of That Darn Cat, and Goosebumps. In 2000, they made their directorial debut with Screwed.

In 2007, they both appeared in the documentary Dreams on Spec, a film looking at the Hollywood creative process from the perspective of the writer.

The duo wrote Tim Burton's 2014 film Big Eyes, a biopic about painter Margaret Keane. They were slated to direct but vacated later. The film took them eleven years to get made.

In 2016, the team created their first television series, American Crime Story, which is a true crime anthology drama. The first season is based on the O. J. Simpson trial. The show won nine Primetime Emmys after it aired on FX in 2016, with Alexander and Karaszewski nominated for Outstanding Writing for a Limited Series, Movie, or Dramatic Special. They won the Emmy, Golden Globe, Writers Guild Award, and Producers Guild Award for this miniseries.

In 2019, they wrote the biopic Dolemite Is My Name, Eddie Murphy’s return to the big screen, which has a 97% rating on Rotten Tomatoes.

Karaszewski and Alexander have been inducted into the Final Draft (software) Screenwriter Hall of Fame. Other inductees include Quentin Tarantino, Robert Towne and Paul Schrader.  They have also both served as advisors to the Sundance Screenwriting Labs. In 2022 Film Forum in New York City screened a week long retrospective of their biographical films.

Karaszewski is currently a Governor for the Writers Branch of the Academy of Motion Picture Arts and Sciences. He is also Vice President of History and Preservation for the Academy. Karaszewski co-chaired the Oscar’s International Executive Committee from 2018-2020. He was instrumental in changing the name of the category from Best Foreign Language Film to Best International Feature.

Alexander has served four terms on the Board of Directors for the Writers Guild of America West.

The duo are active cineastes in Los Angeles hosting screenings of classic films for the American Cinematheque.  Karaszewski’s numerous film commentaries can be found on the website Trailers from Hell. Karaszewski also currently serves on the board of directors of the National Film Preservation Foundation. 

Both Karaszewski and Alexander were teenage filmmakers. Alexander’s Super 8 work was featured in a traveling theatrical release spotlighting young directors that also included J.J. Abrams. Karaszewski spent his youth as actor/writer/director on the award winning student television program Beyond Our Control.

They are frequent guests on film related podcasts. Among the shows they have appeared on are Maltin on Movies, Gilbert Gottfried's Amazing Colossal Podcast, The Movies That Made Me, The Pure Cinema Podcast, The Dana Gould Hour, The Marx Brothers Council Podcast, The Big Picture, The Treatment, The Film Scene with Ileana Douglas, The Adam Corolla Show, Post Mortem with Mick Garris, The Cannon with Amy Nicholson and The Empire Film Podcast.

The Academy Museum of Motion Pictures in Los Angeles has spotlighted their career with several exhibits including a display of “scene cards” from the third act of “The People vs Larry Flynt” and the original Kaypro computer that the team use to write “Ed Wood.”

Filmography
Film writers

Producers
 Auto Focus (2002)

Television

References

External links

1961 births
1963 births
American film directors
American male screenwriters
Primetime Emmy Award winners
Golden Globe Award-winning producers
Best Screenplay Golden Globe winners
Living people
Screenwriting duos
Screenwriters from California
USC School of Cinematic Arts alumni
Writers Guild of America Award winners
American people of Polish descent